Yvon Joseph (born October 31, 1957) is a retired Haitian basketball player.  He played collegiately at Georgia Tech and appeared in one game in the National Basketball Association.  Joseph was the first native Haitian to play NCAA Division I college basketball in the United States.

Joseph, a 6'11" center from Cap-Haïtien, Haiti, had never played organized basketball in 1980 when he was discovered by a coach from Miami Dade College and was offered a scholarship to the school. A former volleyball player, Joseph picked up the game quickly, leading the team to an undefeated regular season in his sophomore campaign and reaching the NJCAA Tournament final, falling to Spud Webb and Midland College in overtime. As an assistant coach at Miami Dad's, Bruce Comer passed him many many balls in the post to help him develop into a basketball player. He then moved to Georgia Tech to play for coach Bobby Cremins, where he played from 1982 to 1985.  He teamed with future NBA players Mark Price and John Salley to lead the Yellow Jackets to their first Atlantic Coast Conference title and the regional finals of the 1985 NCAA Tournament. For his Georgia Tech career, Joseph scored 758 points (11.7 per game) and 446 rebounds (6.9 per game).

After the close of his college career, Joseph was selected by the New Jersey Nets in the second round of the 1985 NBA draft (36th pick overall).  He played only one game in the NBA, scoring 2 points and committing a personal foul in 5 minutes of action against the Indiana Pacers on October 26, 1985.

After basketball, Joseph became a businessman who provides water-purification systems to developing countries.

References

External links

1957 births
Living people
Centers (basketball)
Georgia Tech Yellow Jackets men's basketball players
Haitian men's basketball players
Haitian emigrants to the United States
Miami Dade Sharks men's basketball players
National Basketball Association players from Haiti
New Jersey Nets draft picks
New Jersey Nets players
People from Cap-Haïtien